Le Secret is a 2013 album by Belgian-Italian-Canadian international singer Lara Fabian. It was released on 15 April 2013. The album is produced by her label 9Productions. Distribution was by Warner Music France. after Fabian left her earlier distribution label Universal France. The album was a big success selling a certified 18,768 copies in its first week of release and appearing at number 1 in SNEP, the official French Albums Chart.

She released the single "Deux ils, deux elles" as a pre-release, after performing it live during a concert in favor of same sex marriage. The music video for the song was released on 4 April 2013.

Track listing

Distribution 
France: Warner Music Group
Switzerland : Universal Music Suisse
Belgium / Luxembourg / Netherlands : Universal Music Benelux

Charts

Weekly charts

Year-end charts

Certifications

References

2013 albums
Lara Fabian albums
Warner Music France albums